Alexia is a female form of the Greek male  given name Alexis  that in turn is a variant form of the Latin name Alexius.

The name Alexis became popular in the United States in the 20th century, when actress Alexis Smith began appearing in films; however, Alexia is still used as well. Notable people with the name include:
 Alexia (Italian singer) (born 1967)
 Alexia Bryn (1889–1983), Norwegian pair skater
 Alexia Dechaume-Balleret (born 1970), French tennis player
 Alexia Djilali, French volleyballer
 Alexia González-Barros González (1971–1985), child declared Venerable by Pope Francis
 Alexia Hilbertidou, New Zealand social entrepreneur
 Alexia Kelley, director of the Department of Health and Human Services' Center for Faith-Based and Neighborhood Partnerships
 Alexia Khadime (born 1983), British singer and actress
 Alexia Kourtelesi, Greek judoka
 Alexia Kyriazi, Greek rhythmic gymnast
 Alexia Massalin, American computer scientist and programmer
 Alexia Mupende (1984–2019), Rwandese model, actress and fitness expert
 Alexia Portal, French actress
 Alexia Putellas, midfielder for FC Barcelona Femení and Spain women's national football team
 Alexia Rotsidou (born 1966), Cypriot volleyball coach, former international athlete, and politician
 Alexia Arisarah Schenkel (born 1996), Thai alpine skier
 Alexia Smirli, Greek shooter
 Alexia Walker (born 1982), English cricketer
 Aléxia Zuberer (born 1972), Swiss-French ski mountaineer, ski instructor, and mountain guide
 Princess Alexia of the Netherlands (born 2005)
 Princess Alexia of Greece and Denmark (born 1965)
 Alexia Murtaugh, a fictional character in the webcomic Schlock Mercenary
Alexia Bohwim, Norwegian author

See also 
 
 
 Alessia (given name)
 Alexia (disambiguation)
 Alexias (fl. 4th century BC), Greek physician

References 

Feminine given names
Greek feminine given names